After extensive privatisation of the public sector during the Margaret Thatcher administration, there remain few statutory corporations in the UK. Privatisation began in the late 1970s, and notable privatisations include the Central Electricity Generating Board, British Rail, and more recently Royal Mail. After the Hatfield rail crash accident, the British government decided to intervene and in 2002 renationalised Railtrack (which was responsible for the maintenance of railway tracks and signals) into Network Rail.

United Kingdom Government
BBC
British Business Bank
  (operator of last resort)
London North Eastern Railway
Northern Trains
SE Trains, trading as Southeastern
Civil Aviation Authority
Great British Railways (from 2023)
London and Continental Railways
National Physical Laboratory
Network Rail
OneWeb (17.6% in March 2022) 
Pension Protection Fund
Sheffield Forgemasters (through the Ministry of Defence)
UK Government Investments
British Business Bank
Channel Four Television Corporation
East West Rail
HM Land Registry
Homes England
National Highways
National Nuclear Laboratory
NATS Holdings (air traffic services)
NatWest Group (48.1% in March 2022)
Nuclear Decommissioning Authority
Nuclear Liabilities Fund
Ordnance Survey
Post Office Ltd
Royal Mint
UK Asset Resolution
Bradford & Bingley
UK Export Finance
Urenco Group

Northern Ireland Executive 
 Northern Ireland Water
 Translink

Scottish Government
 Caledonian Maritime Assets
 David MacBrayne
 Caledonian MacBrayne
 Ferguson Marine
 Highlands and Islands Airports
 Prestwick Airport
 Scottish Water
 Scottish Canals
 Scottish Futures Trust
 BiFab/Burntisland Fabrications
 Scottish National Investment Bank
 ScotRail

Welsh Government 
 Cardiff Airport
 Development Bank of Wales 
Transport for Wales
Transport for Wales Rail

Local government
 City of Derry Airport (Derry City Council)

Companies owned by municipalities of England

  Blackpool Transport
  Ipswich Buses
  London Power
  Manchester Airport Holdings (Greater Manchester local authorities)
 Manchester Metrolink (Transport for Greater Manchester)
  Merseytravel
  Newquay Airport
  Nottingham City Transport
 Nottingham Express Transit
 Portsmouth International Port
  Reading Buses
  Sheffield International Venues
  South Yorkshire Passenger Transport Executive
  Transport for Greater Manchester
  Transport for London
 London Underground (Transport for London)
  Transport for West Midlands
 West Midlands Metro
  Tyne and Wear Passenger Transport Executive
 Tyne and Wear Metro (Tyne and Wear Integrated Transport Authority)
  Warrington's Own Buses
  West Yorkshire Metro

Companies owned by municipalities of Scotland

 Bus na Comhairle
 Cairngorm Mountain Railway
 Lothian Buses
 Orkney Ferries
 SIC Ferries
 Strathclyde Buses
 Strathclyde Partnership for Transport
 Transport for Edinburgh
 Transport Initiatives Edinburgh

Wales
 Cardiff Bus
 Newport Bus

References